The Chesapeake and Ohio Canal National Historical Park is located in the District of Columbia and the state of Maryland. The park was established in 1961 as a National Monument by President Dwight D. Eisenhower to preserve the neglected remains of the Chesapeake and Ohio Canal and many of its original structures. In 2013, the path was designated as the first section of U.S. Bicycle Route 50.

The Chesapeake and Ohio Canal

Construction on the Chesapeake and Ohio Canal (also known as "the Grand Old Ditch" or the "C&O Canal") began in 1828 and ended in 1850 when the canal reached Cumberland, far short of its intended destination of Pittsburgh, Pennsylvania. Occasionally there was talk of extending the 184.5-mile canal: for example, an 1874 proposal to dig an 8.4-mile tunnel through the Allegheny Mountains, and there was a tunnel built to connect with the Pennsylvania canal. Even though the Baltimore and Ohio Railroad (B&O) beat the canal to Cumberland by eight years, the canal was not entirely obsolete. Only in the mid-1870s did larger locomotives and the adoption of air brakes allow the railroad to set rates lower than the canal, sealing its fate.

The C&O Canal operated from 1831 to 1924 and served primarily to transport coal from the Allegheny Mountains to Washington D.C. The canal was closed in 1924, in part due to several severe floods that devastated the canal's financial condition.

Federal government purchases canal

In 1938, the abandoned canal was obtained from the B&O Railroad by the United States in exchange for a loan from the federal Reconstruction Finance Corporation. The government planned to restore it as a recreation area. Additionally, it was viewed as a project for employment for the jobless during the Great Depression. By 1940, the first  of the canal were repaired and rewatered, from Georgetown to Violettes lock (Lock 23) and returned to operating condition by African-American enrollees with the Civilian Conservation Corps. The first Canal Clipper boat, giving mule-driven rides, began in 1941. It was later replaced by the John Quincy Adams in the 1960s.

The project was halted when the United States entered World War II and resources were needed elsewhere. In 1941, Harry Athey suggested to President Franklin Roosevelt that the canal could be converted into an underground highway or a bomb shelter with its roof for landing airplanes. The whole idea was deemed impractical due to the river's periodic flooding. In 1942, freshets destroyed the rewatered sections of the canal. National Park Service (NPS) official Arthur E. Demaray pressed that the canal from Dam #1 be restored, to supply water to the Dalecarlia Reservoir in case sabotage or bombing destroyed the normal conduits of water. Since this transformed the canal into a concern of national security, in 1942, the War Production Board approved the work. By 1943, Congress had funded the work, repairs were done, and the Park Service resumed boat trips in October 1943.

The Congress expressed interest in developing the canal and towpath as a parkway. Because of the flooding from the 1920s to the 1940s, the Army Corps of Engineers proposed building 14 dams, that would have permanently inundated 74 miles of towpath, as well as the Monocacy and Antietam aqueducts. Around 1945, the Corps wanted to remove Dam #8, which would destroy any hope of rewatering the canal above Dam #5, as well as put a levee around in the Cumberland area. Much of this was done, with the NPS cooperating with the Corps, since maintaining an operating canal all the way to Cumberland was too expensive, as well as wanting to preserve the western parts of the canal.

Creation of the national park

The Douglas hike
The idea of turning the canal over to automobiles was opposed by some, including United States Supreme Court Associate Justice William O. Douglas. In March 1954, Douglas led an eight-day hike of the towpath from Cumberland to D.C. Although 58 people participated in one part of the hike or another, only nine men, including Douglas, Merlo J. Pusey, and Olaus Murie, hiked the full . Following this hike, Justice Douglas formed a committee, later to be known as the C&O Canal Association in 1957, which would draft plans to preserve and protect the Canal. Serving as the chairman of this group, his commitment to the park proved successful.

Towpath
In 1958, the entire path was cleared for hiking and a 12-mile bicycle trail was built on the towpath, from Georgetown's Mule Bridge at 34th Street in Washington, DC to Widewater, MD. The bicycle trail was built by laying crushed blue stone over the muddy towpath and opened on November 22, 1958. Cyclists were biking the full route by 1960.

National monument, then national historical park 
In 1961, President Dwight Eisenhower made the canal a national monument under the Antiquities Act, but that hardened the opposition to making the canal a national park. There was some support for making the Potomac River a national river instead. Within ten years, the political climate had changed, and realizing that the national river plan was unsupportable, the idea of turning the canal into a historic park had little opposition. The Chesapeake and Ohio Canal National Historical Park Act  established the canal as a National Historical Park and President Richard Nixon signed it into law on January 8, 1971.

Floods of 1996
The winter and summer of 1996 saw two separate floods. Following a blizzard in January, heavy rains washed away the snow and caused extreme flooding and run-off. This major winter flood swept across 80 to 90 percent of the canal and towpath, causing high waters, along with the adjacent Potomac River. Erosion due to the floods lead to heavy damages to the towpath and much of the infrastructure of the canal and park. Following the winter flood, there was an overwhelming need for volunteers in response to the damages caused. Unfortunately, in September, Hurricane Fran caused even more damage to the canal in multiple parts, requiring workers and volunteers to restore and reconstruct the towpath and re-water the canal, several major projects that would take a large amount of time and money to complete.

Restoration efforts
Today, several organizations work to preserve and restore the park's beauty and history. The C&O Canal Trust, founded in 2007, is the official non-profit partner of the National Park Service. The C&O Canal Association  is an all-volunteer citizens organization established in 1954 to help conserve of the natural and historical environment of the C&O Canal and the Potomac River Basin. Together they are making progress in restoration efforts of Canal infrastructure, fixing eroded sections of the towpath and re-watering sections of the Canal to keep it beautiful for both visitors and wildlife, as well as educating the community on the Canal's rich history in interactive ways at the six different visitor centers along the canal: Georgetown, Great Falls Tavern, Brunswick, Williamsport, Hancock, and Cumberland, operated by the National Park Service and its rangers.

Current restoration and construction efforts include restoring and rewatering the Conococheague Aqueduct, restoring Locks 3 and 4, repairs at Great Falls (Lock 20) and Swain's Lock (Lock 21). A second phase of work at the Paw Paw tunnel started on May 13, 2019.

Today

Extent
A small portion of the towpath near Harpers Ferry National Historical Park doubles as a section of the Appalachian Trail.

The canal begins at its zero mile marker (accessible only via Thompson's Boat House), directly on the Potomac, opposite the Watergate complex. Author John Kelly, writing for The Washington Post in 2004, suggested that the name of the Watergate complex may derive from its location directly adjacent to the canal's zero milepost, where to this day, the canal's large wooden gate sits directly on the Potomac and adjacent to the complex. Kelly wrote, a canal lock is "quite literally, a water gate."

In Allegany County, Maryland, the park includes the Western Maryland Railroad Right-of-Way, Milepost 126 to Milepost 160, listed on the National Register of Historic Places in 1981.

Flooding continues to threaten historical structures on the canal and attempts at restoration. The Park Service has re-watered portions of the canal, but the majority of the canal does not have water in it.

Usage

Varied in its geography, the canal and its towpath along with the adjacent Potomac offers activities including running, hiking, biking, fishing, boating and kayaking, as well as rock climbing in certain locations. The Canal also offers a variety of wildlife and birdwatching opportunities.

The seven National Park Service visitor centers have displays and interpretive exhibits on the history of the canal. The park offers rides on two reproduction canal boats — the Georgetown and the Charles F. Mercer (named after the first president of the Canal corporation, and not the first boat on the canal named Charles F. Mercer) — during the spring, summer and autumn. The boats are pulled by mules, and park rangers in historical dress work the locks and boat while presenting a historical program.

Chesapeake and Ohio Canal National Historical Park receives around five million recreation visits annually. Access through the Great Falls Tavern Visitor Center requires payment, but access anywhere else in the park is free. In January 2015, the National Park Service proposed adding entrance fees to virtually all access points along the towpath; the proposal was rescinded in February, amid backlash from communities along the canal.

On February 9, 1963, Robert F. Kennedy succeeded in hiking from Great Falls, Maryland to Harpers Ferry, West Virginia along the C&O Canal towpath as part of the "50 mile frenzy" created by his brother President John F. Kennedy.  In February 2013, FreeWalkers, Inc., a New Jersey-based non-profit, created the FreeWalkers Kennedy50 50-Mile walk along the C&O Canal towpath from Old Anglers Inn to Harpers Ferry, West Virginia to commemorate RFK's historic walk and continues to be held annually.

Hiker biker campsites

The National Park Service maintains a number of hiker/biker campsites, about every  along the towpath. These are available for free on a first come first served basis. A list of hiker biker campsites is available from the NPS.

Other camping

The C&O Canal NHP also offers tent and primitive RV campsites for individuals and group as large as 35. Not all campsites have all amenities; campsites may have some or all of parking, restrooms, picnic tables, boat ramp, and nearby shopping. Hiker-biker campsites are free of charge to use for a maximum of one night per trip. They are used under a first-come, first-served basis. As of December 1, 2016 all drive-in (car) campsites moved from a first-come, first served system to a reservation system on Recreation.gov. Group campsites are $40 during peak season and $20 during off season. Here is a list of the drive-in, reservation campsites: (data from NPS):

See also
 Bear Island
 Billy Goat Trail
 Chesapeake and Ohio Canal Association
 Great Falls of the Potomac River
 Harpers Ferry National Historical Park
 Olmsted Island

References

 Butcher, Russell D. (1997). Exploring Our National Historic Parks and Sites. Roberts Rinehart Publishers
 National Park Service. Chesapeake and Ohio Canal National Historical Park.  Retrieved 2010-05-11.

External links

Chesapeake & Ohio Canal NHP - Official site
C&O Canal Trust - official non-profit partner of the C&O Canal NHP
CanalBird.com - "About The Chesapeake & Ohio Canal"
C&O Canal is part of the Chesapeake Bay Gateways and Watertrails Network
The Building of the Chesapeake and Ohio Canal - A National Park Service Teaching with Historic Places (TwHP) lesson plan

 
1938 establishments in Washington, D.C.
Buildings and structures in Hagerstown, Maryland
Canal museums in the United States
Canals on the National Register of Historic Places in Maryland
Canals on the National Register of Historic Places in Virginia
Canals on the National Register of Historic Places in Washington, D.C.
Chesapeake and Ohio Canal
Cumberland, Maryland
Historic districts in Morgan County, West Virginia
Journey Through Hallowed Ground National Heritage Area
Long-distance trails in the United States
National Historical Parks of the United States
National Park Service areas in Washington, D.C.
National parks of the Appalachians
National Register of Historic Places in Allegany County, Maryland
National Register of Historic Places in Frederick County, Maryland
National Register of Historic Places in Washington County, Maryland
National Register of Historic Places in Morgan County, West Virginia
Parks in Allegany County, Maryland
Parks in Cumberland, MD-WV-PA
Parks in Frederick County, Maryland
Parks in Montgomery County, Maryland
Parks in Washington County, Maryland
Parks in Washington, D.C.
Parks on the National Register of Historic Places in Maryland
Parks on the National Register of Historic Places in Virginia
Parks on the National Register of Historic Places in Washington, D.C.
Parks on the National Register of Historic Places in West Virginia
Protected areas established in 1938